Ernst Sabeditsch (6 May 1920 – 30 June 1986) was an Austrian footballer and coach.

Career
Sabeditsch had a spell in Colombia with Samarios during the 1951 season.

References

External links
 Sturm Archiv
 rsssf.com
 

1920 births
1986 deaths
Austrian footballers
German footballers
Austrian expatriate footballers
Austria international footballers
Germany international footballers
Dual internationalists (football)
Association football midfielders
First Vienna FC players
Unión Magdalena footballers
Austrian football managers
LASK managers
FC Schaffhausen managers
Expatriate footballers in Colombia
Austrian expatriate sportspeople in Colombia